The Nonprofit Quarterly, also known as NPQ, is a nonprofit magazine publication which provides research-based articles and resources to educate the nonprofit sector. The publication focuses on management, fundraising practices, philanthropy, and governance/board management.

The Quarterly was originally founded, published and edited by David Garvey in 1994, as the New England Nonprofit Quarterly, as a regional learning magazine for New England nonprofit practitioners. The Nonprofit Quarterly launched as a national print journal in the winter of 1999, and now also publishes daily content online. The current editor-in-chief of NPQ is Cynthia Suarez, who assumed the role as of January 1, 2021.

The Nonprofit Quarterly magazine was incubated by Third Sector New England until 2006, "when it spun off as an independent publication."

In 2019, Nonprofit Quarterly became home to the online archives of the Grassroots Fundraising Journal.

References

Further reading

External links
 Official webpage

Magazines established in 1994
Magazines published in Boston
Quarterly magazines published in the United States
Non-profit organizations based in Boston